Emily Wesutila (born 8 March 1973) was a Kenyan female volleyball player. She was part of the Kenya women's national volleyball team.

She competed with the national team at the 2000 Summer Olympics in Sydney, Australia, finishing 11th.

See also
 Kenya at the 2000 Summer Olympics

References

External links
 
http://kenyapage.net/commentary/kenya-sports-commentary/kenya-womens-volleyball-caps-four-decades-of-excellence/
https://www.alamy.com/stock-photo-kenyan-athlete-emily-wesutila-wipes-tears-from-her-eyes-as-she-sits-118548612.html
http://www.todor66.com/volleyball/Olympics/Women_2000.html

1973 births
Living people
Kenyan women's volleyball players
Place of birth missing (living people)
Volleyball players at the 2000 Summer Olympics
Olympic volleyball players of Kenya